Thank God You're Here is an improvisational comedy game show based on the original Australian show with the same name. In the show, four guests are placed into a scene they have no knowledge about and have to improvise. The series is hosted by Paul Merton, who also acts as judge and performs his own improvised scene.

Production
The UK pilot, made for ITV by talkbackTHAMES, was announced in mid-2007. The pilot was recorded on 12 November 2007 at The London Studios, with Merton as the show's host (with him also featuring in a one-off improvisational scene of his own). The series started airing on 12 January 2008 on ITV. 
The show delivered below-average ratings for ITV in its timeslot.

Episodes

Ensemble Cast

 Tara Flynn
 Cicely Giddings
 Nick Haverson
 Rufus Jones
 Richard Katz
 Dan Mersh
 Aimee Parkes

References

External links

2000s British comedy television series
2008 British television series debuts
2008 British television series endings
Improvisational television series
ITV comedy
Television series by Fremantle (company)

fr:Dieu merci !